Idaiyangudi is a village , at Idaiyangudi panchayat in Tirunelveli district in the Indian state of Tamil Nadu. It lies between Uvari and Thisayanvilai. The nearest railway station is Nanguneri and the nearest airport is in Thoothukudi. It is well connected to Thirunelveli, 40 miles north-west. This village was the recipient of the Uthamar Gandhi award in 2008.

Geography
The region is mostly semi-arid and the weather is humid though the evenings are cooler as the Bay of Bengal is just two kilometres away.

History 

Robert Caldwell, who is known as the father of Dravidian languages, spent most part of his life in this village as a missionary. He was an Irish. Due to his firm faith in Christianity, he joined a missionary and arrived India to spread Christianity. During his Indian journey, he selected this village to stay,  and he decided to spread Christianity in this region. From then , he lived in this village until his death.

After death, his grave remain in altar of the Holy Trinity church. To recognize his contributions for Tamil language, Robert Caldwell's house in Idaiyangudi was converted into a memorial by Government of Tamil Nadu.

Demographics
Majority of the people living here are Christians. They were mostly converted by Robert Caldwell in the 18th century.

Landmarks

Holy Trinity Church, which is situated in the heart of the village, is considered as the landmark of this village. The church was constructed by Robert Caldwell. The church was built in Gothic style. This church was inaugurated on 6 July 1880. Most of the land around this village is owned by the church.

Education
The Caldwell Centenary Memorial Higher Secondary School caters to educational needs of the children present in the village, though many move to schools in the neighbouring places. There is a nursing college that trains students for the nursing profession.

References 

Cities and towns in Tirunelveli district